The Asháninka Communal Reserve (Reserva Comunal Asháninka) is a protected area in Peru located in the Junín Region, Satipo Province, Río Tambo District.

According to the government of Peru, the reserve is 712.24 square miles in size.

See also 
 Asháninka
 Natural and Cultural Peruvian Heritage

References

External links 
 www.parkswatch.org / Asháninka Communal Reserve 

Communal reserves of Peru
Geography of Junín Region